Alexandra Perper (born 29 July 1991) is a former professional Moldovan tennis player.

In her career, she won four singles and seven doubles titles on tournaments of the ITF Circuit. On 25 June 2018, she reached her best singles ranking of world No. 406. On 30 April 2018, she peaked at No. 385 in the WTA doubles rankings.

Playing for the Moldova Fed Cup team, Perper has a win–loss record of 7–5.

ITF Circuit finals

Singles: 8 (4 titles, 4 runner-ups)

Doubles: 17 (7 titles, 10 runner–ups)

References

External links
 
 
 

1991 births
Living people
Moldovan female tennis players